Will Berzinski (July 18, 1934 – March 4, 1994) was a halfback in the National Football League. He was drafted in the fourth round of the 1956 NFL Draft by the Los Angeles Rams and would play that season with the Philadelphia Eagles.

References

People from Arcadia, Wisconsin
Players of American football from Wisconsin
Philadelphia Eagles players
American football halfbacks
Wisconsin–La Crosse Eagles football players
1934 births
1994 deaths